Oshvand (also Romanized as ‘Oshvand and Eshvand; also known as Amīrābād, Āshīnad, and Oshyand) is a village in Shaban Rural District, in the Central District of Nahavand County, Hamadan Province, Iran. At the 2006 census, its population was 611, in 140 families.

References 

Populated places in Nahavand County